João Pedro may refer to:

Footballers
China (footballer, born 1982), João Pedro dos Santos Gonçalves, Brazilian footballer
Jeitoso (born 1991), João Pedro Mussica, Mozambican footballer
João Amaral (footballer, born 1991), João Pedro Reis Amaral, Portuguese footballer
João Belo (footballer) (1910–????), João Pedro Bellard Belo, Portuguese former footballer
João Cardoso (footballer, born 1997), João Pedro Pinto Cardoso, Portuguese footballer
João Camacho (born 1994), João Pedro Gomes Camacho, Portuguese footballer
João Carneiro (born 1987), João Pedro Barreira Carneiro, Portuguese footballer
João Correia (footballer, born 1996), João Pedro Araújo Correia, Portuguese footballer
João Gonçalves (footballer) (born 1988), João Pedro do Espírito Santo Gonçalves, Portuguese former footballer 
João Graça (born 1995), João Pedro Salazar da Graça, Portuguese footballer
João Martins (footballer, born 1982), João Pedro Pinto Martins, Angolan footballer
João Nogueira (footballer) (born 1986), João Pedro Salgado Nogueira, Portuguese footballer
João Paiva (born 1983), João Pedro de Lemos Paiva, Portuguese footballer
João Pedro (footballer, born 1975), João Pedro Fernades, French-born Portuguese former footballer
João Pedro (footballer, born 1980), João Pedro Lima Santos, Portuguese former footballer
João Pedro (footballer, born 1984), João Pedro Henriques Neto, Portuguese former footballer
João Pedro (footballer, born 1986), João Pedro Guerra Cunha, Portuguese footballer
João Pedro (footballer, born May 1987), João Pedro Oliveira Araújo, Portuguese footballer
João Pedro (footballer, born December 1987), João Pedro Azevedo Silva, Portuguese footballer
João Pedro (footballer, born 1989), João Pedro Mendes Silva, Portuguese footballer
João Pedro (footballer, born 1992), João Pedro Geraldino dos Santos Galvão, Italian footballer
João Pedro (footballer, born 3 April 1993), João Pedro Almeida Machado, Portuguese footballer
João Pedro (footballer, born 22 April 1993), João Pedro Pereira dos Santos, Brazilian footballer
João Pedro (footballer, born April 1996), João Pedro Maciel Silva, Brazilian footballer
João Pedro (footballer, born 13 November 1996), João Pedro Sousa Silva, Portuguese footballer
João Pedro (footballer, born 15 November 1996), João Pedro Maturano dos Santos, Brazilian footballer
João Pedro (footballer, born 1999), João Pedro Mendes Santos, Brazilian footballer
João Pedro (footballer, born April 2000), João Pedro Costa Contreiras Martins, Brazilian footballer
João Pedro (footballer, born August 2000), João Pedro da Silva Freitas, East Timorese footballer
João Pedro (footballer, born 2001), João Pedro Junqueira de Jesus, Brazilian footballer for Watford
João Pedro (footballer, born 2002), João Pedro de Moura Siembarski, Brazilian footballer
João Pedro (footballer, born 2004), João Pedro de Sá Mendonça, Brazilian footballer
João Pedro (footballer, born 1997) (João Pedro Heinen Silva), Brazilian footballer
João Pedro Sousa (born 1971), Portuguese former footballer and current manager of Portuguese club Famalicão
João Silva (footballer, born 1990), João Pedro Pereira Silva, Portuguese footballer
João Ventura (born 1994), João Pedro Ventura Medeiros, Portuguese footballer
Jota (footballer, born 1999), João Pedro Neves Filipe, Portuguese footballer
Pedrinho (footballer, born 1993), João Pedro Oliveira Santos, Brazilian footballer
Pedro Mingote (born 1980), João Pedro Mingote Ribeiro, Portuguese former footballer
Pepê (footballer, born 1998), João Pedro Vilardi Pinto, Brazilian footballer

Other people
João Pedro de Almeida Mota (1744–1817), Portuguese composer
João Ferreira (hurdler), João Pedro Ferreira, Portuguese former athlete
João Pedro, Portuguese bass player with Moonspell
João Pedro de Magalhães, Portuguese microbiologist
João Pedro Mouzinho de Albuquerque (1736–1802), Portuguese nobleman 
João Pedro Pais (born 1971), Portuguese singer
João Pedro Pio (born 1996), Brazilian futsal player
João Pedro Rodrigues (born 1966), Portuguese film director
João Pedro Silva (triathlete) (born 1989), Portuguese triathlete
João Pedro Silva (handballer) (born 1994), Brazilian handball player
João Pedro Sorgi (born 1993), Brazilian tennis player
João Pedro Torlades O'Neill, Portuguese former vice-consul of Belgium from Portugal

See also
John Peter (disambiguation)
John Petre (disambiguation)